To the End of the Earth Tour is the second concert tour by Australian recording artist Jessica Mauboy, but her first solo headlining national tour. There are 27 shows in metropolitan and regional Australia, running from November 2013 to January 2014. Launched to support the release of her third studio album, Beautiful (2013), the tour began on 7 November 2013 in Adelaide, South Australia. A diverse set of songs from the studio albums Been Waiting, Get 'Em Girls and Beautiful, along with covers and songs from The Sapphires are part of the tour.

Background and synopsis
In July 2013, Mauboy announced the To the End of the Earth Tour, a national tour presented by Nescafé to celebrate its global 75th anniversary. Tickets for the tour went on sale on 5 August. Mauboy is also headlining a series of Nescafé intimate acoustic sessions in five cities. The tour has been choreographed by Marko Panzic. Mauboy said that her shows will take the audience on a "journey from (her) early career right up to now" and noted that "it's time to look back and then look forward." Mauboy says that the tour creates "one big party atmosphere" and that there will be "fun costumes, an amazing band, it's a big show." Mauboy is playing two shows at the Darwin Entertainment Centre, in her hometown Darwin, and said that it would be "amazing" to have all her friends, family and familiar faces in the audience.

The setlist also includes an encore of "Inescapable" and "Pop a Bottle (Fill Me Up)". The five acts consisted of songs from:

Been Waiting
Get 'Em Girls
The Sapphires
Beautiful

Critical reception 
Mauboy has garnered positive reviews and high praise for her To the End of the Earth Tour shows. The first show in Adelaide received exceptional reviews from critics. Matt Gilbertson from Adelaide Now stated, "Jessica Mauboy proves that she has more than what it takes to compete on the international pop scene delivering a truly world class performance", before noting that Mauboy's energy, extraordinary vocals and endearing personality spoke for itself. Gilbertson described Mauboy as "one of Australia's finest female pop treasures" and stated that the whole crowd was on their feet by the end of the night.

Glamadelaide commented that one of the highlights of the show was when the "whole band changed outfits for The Sapphires medley", where Mauboy's voice "absolutely soared". Glamadelaide also praised Mauboy's fashion choices and swift costume changes, noting that she looked fierce in silver leather shorts and a jacket with the letters 'JM 89' on the back. Writers from music blogging site auspOp reviewed Mauboy's Melbourne show and stated that she had "great stage presence". auspOp also noted that Mauboy's renditions of "I Have Nothing" along with "Time After Time" were "brilliant" and the "whole auditorium came to a hush" in the special "moment", before highlighting that Mauboy has done an exceptional job growing up in the public eye.

Of her Sydney show, Yahoo 7 commented that Mauboy is the "hardest working girl in showbiz" and revved up the audience with "confidence and gusto", while also mentioning that her "powerful vocal range was in stunning display" when she sang "I Have Nothing". Yahoo 7 also stated: 'There were at least five fabulous costume changes, from silver space-suit-like numbers to glittery, sparkly dresses, all made in such speed at least one audience member nearby remarked at how bewildered they were that Mauboy managed it.' Clayton Bennett from NT News stated that Mauboy's "double date" in Darwin "didn't disappoint", and that "everyone was keen to see Jess on stage" for her two sell-out shows. Bennett described Mauboy as a "bubbly beauty" and also noted the diversity of the "packed" Darwin audience, consisting of family, friends and fans.

Dannielle Elms from Renowned for Sound commented that Mauboy "wowed" the crowd at her Brisbane concert, before stating: "Her voice was faultless, her style was refined and choreographed and her banter and communication with the audience was sweet, funny and classy."

Opening acts 
Nathaniel Willemse (All other tour dates except Melbourne)
The Collective (Melbourne)

Set list 
This set list consists of 24 songs and is representative of the 1st show in Adelaide. It does not represent all concerts for the duration of the tour.

"Up/Down"
"Burn"
"Been Waiting"
"Let Me Be Me"
"I Have Nothing" (cover)
"Time After Time" (cover)
"What Happened to Us"
"Because"
"Running Back"
"Scariest Part"
"Foreign"
"Reconnected"
"Get 'Em Girls"
"Handle It"
"Who's Loving You" (cover)
"I Heard It Through The Grapevine" (cover)
"I Can't Help Myself (Sugar Pie Honey Bunch)" (cover)
"Land of a Thousand Dances" (cover)
"Gotcha"
"Beautiful"
"To the End of the Earth"
"Saturday Night"

Encore
 "Inescapable" 
 "Pop a Bottle (Fill Me Up)" 

Notes
 "I Have Nothing" was the song that Mauboy auditioned with for Australian Idol.
 For the performance of "What Happened to Us", Nathaniel Willemse sings the parts of Jay Sean. However, the song was not part of the Melbourne show setlist due to Willemse's absence as a result of unforeseen circumstances.

Tour dates

Personnel
Credits and personnel are taken from the Official To the End of the Earth Tour Program.

Behind the scenes
Creative direction:
 Jessica Mauboy and Darryl Beaton – Show/musical direction
 Jessica Mauboy and Kevin Mendoza – Creative/technical direction
 Marko Panzic – Choreography
 Mikey Ayoubi – Styling for Mauboy
 Johnny Schembri – Costume design for Mauboy
 John-Pierre Georges and Angela White – Styling and costumes for band
 Bravo Child and Alphamama – Styling assistants

Production:
 Ade Barnard – Production manager
 Connie Samaniego - Assistant to Mauboy, WHS & Security
 Chris Braun – Front-of-House engineer
 Ivan Ordenes – Monitor engineer
 Michael "Simmo" Simpson – Stage and lighting
 Mark Bollenberg – PA Tech
 Pat Meyer – Guitar tech
 Christian Walsh – Drum tech

Management:
 David Champion – Management 
 Robyn Jelleff – Tour manager 
 Nine Live – Promoter 
 Nescafé – Sponsor

Band
 Jessica Mauboy – Lead vocals

Beatiq musicians:
 Darryl Beaton – Musical director, keyboards and guitar
 Kevin Mendoza – Drums and percussion
 Kyle Mercado – Bass
 Paul Mason – Guitar
 Tabitha Ojeah – Backing vocals
 Anita Meiruntu – Backing vocals

References

2013 concert tours
Jessica Mauboy concert tours